Krystal Kherson is a professional football club from Kherson in Ukraine that has a long history in the Soviet and then the Ukrainian Leagues.  As of the 2020–21 season, it will play in the Ukrainian First League, the second tier of Ukrainian football, following promotion from the 2019–20 Ukrainian Second League.

History

Predecessors
Before the World War II, there existed Lokomotyv Kherson (like in 1938).

Following the war since 1946, Kherson was represented by Spartak in 1947 – Dynamo, in 1948 and 1949 – Avanhard.

Since 1950, Kherson was represented again by Spartak Kherson. In 1957, Spartak played for the last time at republican level. In 1958, Spartak Kherson was admitted to the Soviet Class B.

In 1958 and 1959, Kherson was represented by Avanhard in Ukrainian republican competitions, while Spartak continued to play in Class B.

Club's history

Names
{|class="wikitable"
|-bgcolor="#efefef"
|Year
|Name
|Year
|Name
|-
|1961—1962
|Majak Kherson
|1992—1994
|Tavriya Kherson
|-
|1963—1964
|Budivelnyk Kherson
|1995
|Vodnyk Kherson
|-
|1965—1975
|Lokomotiv Kherson
|1996—1999
|Krystal Kherson
|-
|1975—1992
|Krystal Kherson
|2000—2003
|SC Kherson
|-
|
|
|2003—present
|Krystal Kherson
|}

Original club
The club was formed in 1961 at the Kherson Semiconductor Factory as Mayak. The club replaced the previous city team of masters Spartak Kherson that represented Kherson since 1958.

In 1963, the club was renamed as Stroitel (Budivelnyk). Due to reforms in Soviet football, the division where Stroitel played was demoted the third tier.

In 1965, the club was renamed again as Lokomotyv. The very same year another Lokomotyv Kherson also played in the newly formed competitions among physical fitness clubs. In 1968, the Kherson club was promoted and for couple of seasons played at Class A until 1970 reform when it was admitted to the newly formed Soviet Second League (again as the third tier).

In 1976, the club was renamed for the third time as Krystal.

When Ukraine became independent, the club entered the Persha Liha. Unfortunately, the club was relegated to the Druha Liha where it competed until the club's administration dissolved the club in 2006 and for the first time since 1958 the city did not have own professional club.

Second edition
The club was revived and entered into Ukrainian Amateur competition (Fourth level) in 2011. After a five-year absence from the professional leagues Krystal Kherson applied for readmittance to the Professional Football League of Ukraine and was admitted. The club will compete in the Ukrainian Second League for the 2011–12 season.

In 2017, the club was reorganized and started out again from afresh.

Other clubs
In 1982 and 1988, there also existed club Shlyakhovyk that played in competitions among physical culture clubs (KFK).

Honors
Ukrainian Second League (Druha Liha)
 Winners (1): 1997–98 (B)
 Runners-up (3): 1995–96 (B), 1998–99 (B), 2004–05 (B)
Ukrainian Amateur Football Championship (Chempionat z futbolu sered amatoriv)
Runners-up (1): 2017–18 (Group 3)
Ukrainian Second League Cup (Kubok Druhoi Lihy)
Runners-up (1): 1999-00
Ukrainian Second League
  Fair Play award 2019-20 season

Current squad

League and cup history

Soviet Union
{|class="wikitable"
|-bgcolor="#efefef"
! Season
! Div.
! Pos.
! Pl.
! W
! D
! L
! GS
! GA
! P
!Domestic Cup
!colspan=2|Europe
!Notes
|-
|align=center colspan=14|Mayak Kherson
|-bgcolor=LightCyan
|align=center|1961
|align=center|2nd "Ukr.1"
|align=center|26
|align=center|36
|align=center|10
|align=center|11
|align=center|15
|align=center|35
|align=center|43
|align=center|31
|align=center|
|align=center|
|align=center|
|align=center|Two stages
|-bgcolor=LightCyan
|align=center|1962
|align=center|2nd "Ukr.2"
|align=center|27
|align=center|34
|align=center|8
|align=center|9
|align=center|17
|align=center|44
|align=center|62
|align=center|25
|align=center|
|align=center|
|align=center|
|align=center bgcolor=pink|Two stages/Relegated
|-
|align=center colspan=14|Budivelnyk Kherson
|-bgcolor=PowderBlue
|align=center|1963
|align=center|3rd "Ukr.1"
|align=center|16
|align=center|40
|align=center|15
|align=center|13
|align=center|12
|align=center|51
|align=center|51
|align=center|43
|align=center|
|align=center|
|align=center|
|align=center|Two stages
|-bgcolor=PowderBlue
|align=center|1964
|align=center|3rd "Ukr.2"
|align=center|22
|align=center|
|align=center|
|align=center|
|align=center|
|align=center|
|align=center|
|align=center| 
|align=center|
|align=center|
|align=center|
|align=center|Two stages
|-
|align=center colspan=14|Lokomotyv Kherson
|-bgcolor=PowderBlue
|align=center|1965
|align=center|3rd "Ukr.3"
|align=center|23
|align=center|42
|align=center|13
|align=center|17
|align=center|12
|align=center|41
|align=center|37
|align=center|43
|align=center|
|align=center|
|align=center|
|align=center|Two stages
|-bgcolor=PowderBlue
|align=center|1966
|align=center|3rd "Ukr.2"
|align=center bgcolor=tan|3
|align=center|40
|align=center|21
|align=center|11
|align=center|8
|align=center|57
|align=center|30
|align=center|53
|align=center|
|align=center|
|align=center|
|align=center|Two stages
|-bgcolor=PowderBlue
|align=center|1967
|align=center|3rd "Ukr.2"
|align=center|5
|align=center|40
|align=center|22
|align=center|9
|align=center|9
|align=center|74
|align=center|32
|align=center|53
|align=center|
|align=center|
|align=center|
|align=center bgcolor=lightgreen|Promoted
|-bgcolor=LightCyan
|align=center|1968
|align=center|2nd "2"
|align=center|11
|align=center|40
|align=center|15
|align=center|11
|align=center|14
|align=center|42
|align=center|32
|align=center|41
|align=center|
|align=center|
|align=center|
|align=center|
|-bgcolor=LightCyan
|align=center|1969
|align=center|2nd "3"
|align=center|11
|align=center|42
|align=center|13
|align=center|15
|align=center|14
|align=center|42
|align=center|38
|align=center|41
|align=center|
|align=center|
|align=center|
|align=center bgcolor=pink|Relegated
|-bgcolor=PowderBlue
|align=center|1970
|align=center|3rd "1"
|align=center|10
|align=center|42
|align=center|16
|align=center|12
|align=center|14
|align=center|60
|align=center|50
|align=center|44
|align=center|
|align=center|
|align=center|
|align=center|
|-
|align=center colspan=14|
|-bgcolor=PowderBlue
|align=center|1971
|align=center|3rd "1"
|align=center|13
|align=center|50
|align=center|18
|align=center|14
|align=center|18
|align=center|46
|align=center|53
|align=center|50
|align=center|
|align=center|
|align=center|
|align=center|
|-bgcolor=PowderBlue
|align=center|1972
|align=center|3rd "1"
|align=center|20
|align=center|46
|align=center|15
|align=center|7
|align=center|24
|align=center|55
|align=center|82
|align=center|37
|align=center|
|align=center|
|align=center|
|align=center|
|-bgcolor=PowderBlue
|align=center|1973
|align=center|3rd "1"
|align=center|10
|align=center|44
|align=center|17
|align=center|5/10
|align=center|12
|align=center|49
|align=center|33
|align=center|39
|align=center|
|align=center|
|align=center|
|align=center|no draws
|-bgcolor=PowderBlue
|align=center|1974
|align=center|3rd "6"
|align=center|10
|align=center|38
|align=center|13
|align=center|13
|align=center|12
|align=center|49
|align=center|48
|align=center|39
|align=center|
|align=center|
|align=center|
|align=center|
|-bgcolor=PowderBlue
|align=center|1975
|align=center|3rd "6"
|align=center|17
|align=center|32
|align=center|3
|align=center|11
|align=center|18
|align=center|24
|align=center|65
|align=center|17
|align=center|
|align=center|
|align=center|
|align=center|Avoided relegation
|-
|align=center colspan=14|Krystal Kherson
|-bgcolor=PowderBlue
|align=center|1976
|align=center|3rd "6"
|align=center|5
|align=center|38
|align=center|14
|align=center|15
|align=center|9
|align=center|36
|align=center|24
|align=center|43
|align=center|
|align=center|
|align=center|
|align=center|
|-bgcolor=PowderBlue
|align=center|1977
|align=center|3rd "2"
|align=center|7
|align=center|44
|align=center|20
|align=center|12
|align=center|12
|align=center|54
|align=center|40
|align=center|52
|align=center|
|align=center|
|align=center|
|align=center|
|-bgcolor=PowderBlue
|align=center|1978
|align=center|3rd "2"
|align=center|6
|align=center|44
|align=center|20
|align=center|14
|align=center|10
|align=center|46
|align=center|28
|align=center|54
|align=center|
|align=center|
|align=center|
|align=center|
|-bgcolor=PowderBlue
|align=center|1979
|align=center|3rd "2"
|align=center|7
|align=center|46
|align=center|21
|align=center|10
|align=center|15
|align=center|63
|align=center|45
|align=center|52
|align=center|
|align=center|
|align=center|
|align=center|
|-bgcolor=PowderBlue
|align=center|1980
|align=center|3rd "5"
|align=center|11
|align=center|44
|align=center|15
|align=center|16
|align=center|13
|align=center|37
|align=center|37
|align=center|46
|align=center|
|align=center|
|align=center|
|align=center|
|-bgcolor=PowderBlue
|align=center|1981
|align=center|3rd "5"
|align=center|15
|align=center|44
|align=center|15
|align=center|9
|align=center|20
|align=center|62
|align=center|73
|align=center|39
|align=center|
|align=center|
|align=center|
|align=center|
|-bgcolor=PowderBlue
|align=center|1982
|align=center|3rd "6"
|align=center|19
|align=center|46
|align=center|12
|align=center|12
|align=center|22
|align=center|41
|align=center|64
|align=center|36
|align=center|
|align=center|
|align=center|
|align=center|
|-bgcolor=PowderBlue
|align=center|1983
|align=center|3rd "6"
|align=center|16
|align=center|50
|align=center|17
|align=center|10
|align=center|23
|align=center|45
|align=center|55
|align=center|44
|align=center|
|align=center|
|align=center|
|align=center|
|-bgcolor=PowderBlue
|align=center|1984
|align=center|3rd "6"
|align=center|7
|align=center|36
|align=center|16
|align=center|8
|align=center|12
|align=center|45
|align=center|47
|align=center|40
|align=center|
|align=center|
|align=center|
|align=center|Two stages
|-bgcolor=PowderBlue
|align=center|1985
|align=center|3rd "6"
|align=center|17
|align=center|40
|align=center|12
|align=center|16
|align=center|12
|align=center|41
|align=center|46
|align=center|40
|align=center|
|align=center|
|align=center|
|align=center|Two stages
|-bgcolor=PowderBlue
|align=center|1986
|align=center|3rd "6"
|align=center|25
|align=center|40
|align=center|9
|align=center|14
|align=center|17
|align=center|51
|align=center|72
|align=center|32
|align=center|
|align=center|
|align=center|
|align=center|Two stages
|-bgcolor=PowderBlue
|align=center|1987
|align=center|3rd "6"
|align=center|18
|align=center|52
|align=center|16
|align=center|10
|align=center|26
|align=center|54
|align=center|79
|align=center|42
|align=center|
|align=center|
|align=center|
|align=center|
|-bgcolor=PowderBlue
|align=center|1988
|align=center|3rd "6"
|align=center|18
|align=center|50
|align=center|16
|align=center|15
|align=center|19
|align=center|48
|align=center|52
|align=center|47
|align=center|
|align=center|
|align=center|
|align=center|
|-bgcolor=PowderBlue
|align=center|1989
|align=center|3rd "6"
|align=center|25
|align=center|52
|align=center|13
|align=center|10
|align=center|29
|align=center|63
|align=center|84
|align=center|36
|align=center|
|align=center|
|align=center|
|align=center|
|-bgcolor=PowderBlue
|align=center|1990
|align=center|3rd 
|align=center|5
|align=center|36
|align=center|18
|align=center|9
|align=center|9
|align=center|61
|align=center|44
|align=center|45
|align=center|
|align=center|
|align=center|
|align=center|
|-bgcolor=PowderBlue
|align=center|1991
|align=center|3rd 
|align=center|6
|align=center|50
|align=center|23
|align=center|15
|align=center|12
|align=center|82
|align=center|60
|align=center|61
|align=center|
|align=center|
|align=center|
|align=center|
|-
|}

Ukraine
{|class="wikitable"
|-bgcolor="#efefef"
! Season
! Div.
! Pos.
! Pl.
! W
! D
! L
! GS
! GA
! P
!Domestic Cup
!colspan=2|Europe
!Notes
|-bgcolor=LightCyan
|align=center|1992
|align=center|2nd "B"
|align=center|10
|align=center|26
|align=center|10
|align=center|5
|align=center|11
|align=center|36
|align=center|36
|align=center|25
|align=center| finals
|align=center|
|align=center|
|align=center bgcolor=pink|Relegated
|-
|align=center colspan=14|Krystal Kherson → Tavriya Kherson
|-bgcolor=PowderBlue
|align=center|1992–93
|align=center|3rd
|align=center|10
|align=center|34
|align=center|12
|align=center|8
|align=center|14
|align=center|33
|align=center|29
|align=center|32
|align=center| finals
|align=center|
|align=center|
|align=center|
|-bgcolor=PowderBlue
|align=center|1993–94
|align=center|3rd
|align=center|13
|align=center|42
|align=center|13
|align=center|13
|align=center|16
|align=center|44
|align=center|49
|align=center|39
|align=center| finals
|align=center|
|align=center|
|align=center|
|-
|align=center colspan=14|Tavriya Kherson → Vodnyk Kherson
|-bgcolor=PowderBlue
|align=center|1994–95
|align=center|3rd "B"
|align=center|18
|align=center|42
|align=center|11
|align=center|7
|align=center|24
|align=center|35
|align=center|61
|align=center|40
|align=center| finals
|align=center|
|align=center|
|align=center|
|-
|align=center colspan=14|Krystal Kherson
|-bgcolor=PowderBlue
|align=center|1995–96
|align=center|3rd "B"
|align=center bgcolor=silver|2
|align=center|40
|align=center|24
|align=center|7
|align=center|9
|align=center|75
|align=center|29
|align=center|79
|align=center| finals
|align=center|
|align=center|
|align=center|
|-bgcolor=PowderBlue
|align=center|1996–97
|align=center|3rd "B"
|align=center|6
|align=center|32
|align=center|13
|align=center|8
|align=center|11
|align=center|44
|align=center|34
|align=center|47
|align=center| finals 2nd stage
|align=center|
|align=center|
|align=center|
|-bgcolor=PowderBlue
|align=center|1997–98
|align=center|3rd "B"
|align=center bgcolor=gold|1
|align=center|32
|align=center|28
|align=center|2
|align=center|2
|align=center|74
|align=center|20
|align=center|88
|align=center| finals
|align=center|
|align=center|
|align=center|
|-bgcolor=PowderBlue
|align=center|1998–99
|align=center|3rd "B"
|align=center bgcolor=silver|2
|align=center|26
|align=center|20
|align=center|2
|align=center|4
|align=center|55
|align=center|25
|align=center|62
|align=center| finals
|align=center|
|align=center|
|align=center|
|-bgcolor=PowderBlue
|align=center|1999–00
|align=center|3rd "B"
|align=center|5
|align=center|26
|align=center|12
|align=center|5
|align=center|9
|align=center|40
|align=center|30
|align=center|41
|align=center| finals
|align=center|
|align=center|
|align=center|
|-
|align=center colspan=14|SC Kherson
|-bgcolor=PowderBlue
|align=center|2000–01
|align=center|3rd "B"
|align=center|7
|align=center|28
|align=center|12
|align=center|6
|align=center|10
|align=center|26
|align=center|33
|align=center|42
|align=center|USLC:  finals
|align=center|
|align=center|
|align=center|
|-bgcolor=PowderBlue
|align=center|2001–02
|align=center|3rd "B"
|align=center|9
|align=center|34
|align=center|14
|align=center|7
|align=center|13
|align=center|39
|align=center|39
|align=center|49
|align=center| finals
|align=center|
|align=center|
|align=center|
|-
|align=center colspan=14|SC Kherson → Krystal Kherson
|-bgcolor=PowderBlue
|align=center|2002–03
|align=center|3rd "B"
|align=center|7
|align=center|30
|align=center|12
|align=center|6
|align=center|12
|align=center|35
|align=center|38
|align=center|42
|align=center| finals
|align=center|
|align=center|
|align=center|
|-bgcolor=PowderBlue
|align=center|2003–04
|align=center|3rd "B"
|align=center|15
|align=center|30
|align=center|7
|align=center|7
|align=center|16
|align=center|26
|align=center|37
|align=center|28
|align=center| finals
|align=center|
|align=center|
|align=center|
|-bgcolor=PowderBlue
|align=center|2004–05
|align=center|3rd "B"
|align=center bgcolor=silver|2
|align=center|26
|align=center|13
|align=center|7
|align=center|6
|align=center|34
|align=center|17
|align=center|46
|align=center| finals
|align=center|
|align=center|
|align=center|
|-bgcolor=PowderBlue
|align=center|2005–06
|align=center|3rd "B"
|align=center|13
|align=center|28
|align=center|7
|align=center|4
|align=center|17
|align=center|29
|align=center|51
|align=center|25
|align=center| finals
|align=center|
|align=center|
|align=center|
|-
|align=center|2006-10
|align=center colspan=13|Club reforms and competes in the Kherson Oblast Championship
|-
|align=center|2010
|align=center colspan=9|regional competitions
|align=center|UAC:  finals
|align=center|
|align=center|
|align=center|
|-bgcolor=SteelBlue
|align=center|2011
|align=center|4th
|align=center|4
|align=center|10
|align=center|5
|align=center|1
|align=center|4
|align=center|19
|align=center|14
|align=center|16
|align=center|
|align=center|
|align=center|
|align=center bgcolor=lightgreen|Admitted to SL
|-bgcolor=PowderBlue
|align=center|2011–12
|align=center|3rd "A"
|align=center|8
|align=center|26
|align=center|9
|align=center|5
|align=center|12
|align=center|30
|align=center|32
|align=center|32
|align=center| finals
|align=center|
|align=center|
|align=center|
|-bgcolor=PowderBlue
|align=center rowspan="2"|2012–13
|align=center|3rd "A"
|align=center|7
|align=center|20 	 	
|align=center|6 		 	
|align=center|2 		 	
|align=center|12 	  			
|align=center|23 	 			 		  	
|align=center|31   		  	
|align=center|20
|align=center rowspan=2| finals
|align=center|
|align=center|
|align=center|
|-bgcolor=PowderBlue
|align=center|3rd "3"
|align=center|2
|align=center|6 	    
|align=center|4 				
|align=center|0 	  		  
|align=center|2 	 			   
|align=center|13 	 	 			      
|align=center|7  	 		 	    
|align=center|12
|align=center|
|align=center|
|align=center|Stage 2
|-bgcolor=PowderBlue
|align=center|2013–14
|align=center|3rd 
|align=center|9
|align=center|36 
|align=center|15  
|align=center|8 
|align=center|13 
|align=center| 51
|align=center|48  
|align=center|53
|align=center| finals
|align=center|
|align=center|
|align=center|
|-bgcolor=PowderBlue
|align=center|2014–15
|align=center|3rd 
|align=center|6
|align=center|27 	
|align=center|10 	
|align=center|6 	
|align=center|11 	
|align=center|39 	
|align=center|37 	
|align=center|36
|align=center| finals
|align=center|
|align=center|
|align=center|
|-bgcolor=PowderBlue
|align=center|2015–16
|align=center|3rd
|align=center|10
|align=center|26 	
|align=center|9 	
|align=center|	1 	
|align=center|16 	
|align=center|31 	
|align=center|47 	
|align=center|28
|align=center| finals
|align=center|
|align=center|
|align=center|
|-bgcolor=PowderBlue
|align=center|2016–17
|align=center|3rd
|align=center|13
|align=center|32
|align=center|7
|align=center|5
|align=center|20
|align=center|31
|align=center|24
|align=center|26
|align=center| finals
|align=center|
|align=center|
|align=center bgcolor=grey|Withdrew
|-
|align=center|2017
|align=center colspan=13|Club reforms as municipal club
|-bgcolor=SteelBlue
|align=center rowspan=2|2017–18
|align=center rowspan=2|4th "3"
|align=center bgcolor=silver rowspan=2|2 	
|align=center rowspan=2|16
|align=center rowspan=2|9 	
|align=center rowspan=2|4 	
|align=center rowspan=2|3 	
|align=center rowspan=2|41 	
|align=center rowspan=2|15 	
|align=center rowspan=2|31
|align=center rowspan=2|
|align=center rowspan=2|
|align=center rowspan=2|
|align=center|Play-offs – QF
|-bgcolor=SteelBlue
| align="center" bgcolor=lightgreen|Admitted to SL
|-bgcolor=PowderBlue
|align=center|2018–19
|align=center|3rd "B"
|align=center|4
|align=center|27
|align=center|15
|align=center|2
|align=center|10
|align=center|43	
|align=center|29
|align=center|47
|align=center| finals
|align=center|
|align=center|
|align=center|
|-bgcolor=PowderBlue
| align="center" |2019–20
| align="center" |3rd "B"
| align="center" bgcolor=silver|2
| align="center" |20
| align="center" |15
| align="center" |2
| align="center" |3
| align="center" |47
| align="center" |17
| align="center" |47
| align="center" | finals
| align="center" |
| align="center" |
| align="center" bgcolor=lightgreen|Promoted
|-bgcolor=LightCyan
| align="center" |2020–21
| align="center" |2nd
| align="center" |16
| align="center" |30
| align="center" |3
| align="center" |4
| align="center" |23
| align="center" |21
| align="center" |61
| align="center" |13
| align="center" | finals
| align="center" |
| align="center" |
| align="center" bgcolor=lightpink|Relegated
|}

Managers

 Vladimir Lebed – (June 2006)

Notable players
  Viktor Prokopenko

References and Notes

External links
 Official web site 

 
Ukrainian Second League clubs
Football clubs in Kherson
Football clubs in the Ukrainian Soviet Socialist Republic
Association football clubs established in 1961
1961 establishments in Ukraine